Morningstar Farms (stylized as MorningStar Farms) is a division of the Kellogg Company that produces vegan and vegetarian food. Many of their offerings are plant-based variations of traditionally meat products. Their products include meatless chicken nuggets, popcorn chicken, corn dogs, breakfast sausage, burgers, hot dogs, bacon, and pizza snack rolls with vegan cheese. Originally, Morningstar offered some, but not all vegan products. In 2019, Morningstar Farms announced all products would be vegan by 2021, but as of December 2022 this is still not true.

History 
Morningstar Farms was introduced by Worthington Foods (originally a division of Miles Laboratories). The frozen food line of soy-based meatless meats was introduced into supermarkets and grocery stores in the U.S. in 1975.  It was widely advertised and introduced Americans to the use of soy as a base for meat analogs. Kellogg's purchased Worthington Foods from Bayer AG's North American division for $307 million in October 1999, at which point it acquired the Morningstar Farms brand. Kellogg sold Worthington in 2014 but retained the Morningstar line of products.
In 2021, Kellogg's announced it would spend $43 million to expand their Zanesville, Ohio Morningstar Farms manufacturing plant.

See also

 List of meat substitutes
 List of vegetarian and vegan companies

References

External links 
 

Kellogg's brands
Meat substitutes
Vegetarian companies and establishments of the United States
Vegan cuisine